Jeonbok-juk or abalone rice porridge is a variety of juk (죽; 粥), or Korean porridge, made with abalone and white rice. Abalone is regarded as a high quality ingredient in Korean cuisine and was often presented as a gift to the king of Korea. The dish is a local specialty of Jeju Island where abalones are commonly harvested. Jeonbokjuk is known as not only a delicacy but also as a nutritional supplement and digestive aid, especially for ill patients or elderly people. Jeonbokjuk can be made with or without the abalone's internal organs. The former type of jeonbokjuk has a green tinge while the latter is more ivory in color.

Preparation and serving
Abalones are first prepared by cleaning with a brush in water, and the flesh is taken out from the flat and middle of the shells with a small kitchen knife. The internal organs are removed separately from the flesh (taking care not to damage them). The flesh is slightly parboiled in a pot of boiling water and then thinly sliced. Rice is soaked in a bowl of water 3 to 4 hours before cooking. The abalone flesh is stir-fried on a pot over a mid-flame with sesame oil, with the soaked rice then added. After stir frying for a while, water is poured into the pot and the dish is cooked at a higher temperature. Constant stirring prevents the ingredients from sticking to the bottom of the pot. After the dish has come to a boil, the heat is lowered and let to simmer. The dish is seasoned with salt or ganjang (Korean soy sauce).

See also
Congee
Jatjuk
Korean cuisine
 List of porridges

References

External links

Jeonbokjuk recipe
Jeonbokjuk recipe

Juk
Korean seafood dishes
Jeju cuisine